The women's high jump event  at the 1989 IAAF World Indoor Championships was held at the Budapest Sportcsarnok in Budapest on 4 and 5 March.

Medallists

Results

Qualification

Qualification: 1.84 metres (Q) or the best 12 (q) qualified for the final

Final

References

High jump
High jump at the World Athletics Indoor Championships